B. Sudarshan Reddy (born: 8 July 1946) is the former justice of the Supreme Court of India and the first Lokayukta of Goa.

Early life
Reddy was born in 1946 at Akula Mylaram Village, erstwhile Ibrahimpatnam Taluq, Ranga Reddy district of the Indian state of Andhra Pradesh in an agricultural family. He studied in Hyderabad and passed law from Osmania University in 1971.

Career
He started practice on Civil and constitutional matters under K. Pratap Reddy, Senior Advocate of Andhra Pradesh High Court. On 8 August 1988 Reddy was appointed as Government Pleader in the High Court and became the Additional Standing Counsel for Central Government. He was elected as President, Andhra Pradesh High Court Advocates Association in 1993. He was also served as Legal Advisor of Osmania University. On 2 May 1993 Reddy became an additional Judge of Andhra Pradesh High Court. He was appointed as Chief Justice of the Gauhati High Court on 5 December 2005. Justice Reddy was elevated in the post of additional Judge of Supreme Court of India on 12 January 2007 and retired on 8 July 2011 from the post. He assumed charge as the first Goa Lokayukta in March 2013 and resigned on personal grounds in October 2013 from the post.

References

1946 births
Living people
Osmania University alumni
Indian judges
Justices of the Supreme Court of India
Chief Justices of the Gauhati High Court
Judges of the Andhra Pradesh High Court
Ombudsmen in India
21st-century Indian lawyers
21st-century Indian judges
Telugu people
People from Ranga Reddy district